DXRF (1260 AM) is a relay station of DZRH, owned and operated by Manila Broadcasting Company. The station's transmitter is located along Broadcast Ave., Shrine Hills, Matina, Davao City.

References

External links
DZRH FB Page
DZRH Website

Radio stations in Davao City
News and talk radio stations in the Philippines
Radio stations established in 1995
DZRH Nationwide stations